Mes Aïeux is a neo-traditional Quebec folk music group founded in 1996.

Style
Although a leader of the Quebec "neo-traditional" scene, the band takes a definitely modern slant on that style, borrowing stories and characters from French Canadian folklore (the devil, the chasse-galerie, the shepherdess, the coureur des bois, drinking songs, etc.) to write about modern themes with a touch of humor.  These themes include globalization (Qui nous mène?), politics (Ça va mal), criticism and mockery of the Quiet Revolution (Dégénérations/Le reel du fossé), over-medicating (Remède miracle), the frenetic pace of modern life (Train de vie/le surcheval, Continuer pareil), recent Quebec history (2096 (chanson à boire)), etc.  Some of their songs involve personalities from Quebec history such as "La Corriveau" (La Corrida de la Corriveau), "The Great Antonio" (Antonio) and "Alexis le Trotteur" (Train de vie/le surcheval).  The band also wrote humorous songs about Québécois cultural phenomena such as poutine (Hommage en grain).

History
In November 2005 their album En famille went platinum (100,000 copies sold) and their two earlier albums, Ça parle au diable and Entre les branches both went gold (50,000 copies sold).  In December 2006, En famille was certified double platinum (200,000 copies sold) and their album Tire-toi une bûche went gold after three weeks.

In 2005 Mes Aïeux was honoured with a Félix Award for the category of Best Contemporary Folk Album for En famille, in addition to being nominated for Group of the Year.

In 2007 Mes Aïeux won 3 Félix Awards for the Group of the year, Best selling album and song of the year.

Line-up

Current members
 Marie-Hélène Fortin - violin, percussion, vocals (1996–present)
 Stéphane Archambault - vocals, melodica (1996–present)
 Frédéric Giroux - guitars, bass, harmonica, glockenspiel, vocals (1996–present)
 Marc-André Paquet - drums, percussions, bass, vocals (1996–present)
 Benoît Archambault - piano, trumpet, accordion, percussions, vocals (1996–present)
 Luc Lemire - saxophone, glockenspiel, percussions (1996–present)

Former members
 Éric Desranleau - vocals, guitars, bass, piano (1996-2011)

Discography
Since their founding, the group has released six albums: 
 Ça parle au diable (2000)
 Entre les branches (2001)
 En famille (2004)
 Tire-toi une bûche (Live) (2006)
 La ligne orange (2008)
 À l'aube du printemps (2012) #5 CAN

References 

Musical groups established in 1996
Musical groups from Montreal
1996 establishments in Quebec
Canadian Folk Music Award winners